Simon E. Fisher (born 1970) is a British geneticist and neuroscientist who has pioneered research into the genetic basis of human speech and language. He is a director of the Max Planck Institute for Psycholinguistics and Professor of language and genetics at the Donders Institute for Brain, Cognition and Behaviour in Nijmegen, The Netherlands.

Education
Fisher was an undergraduate student at Trinity Hall, Cambridge where he read  Natural Sciences.

Career and research
Following his DPhil, he was a postdoctoral researcher in Anthony Monaco's laboratory at the Wellcome Trust Centre for Human Genetics in Oxford.

Fisher is the co-discoverer of FOXP2, the first gene to be implicated in a human speech and language disorder. His subsequent research has used FOXP2 and other language-related genes as molecular windows into neural pathways critical for language.

Awards and honours
Awards and prizes in recognition of his work include the Francis Crick Lecture in 2008 and the inaugural Eric Kandel Young Neuroscientists Prize in 2009.

References 

British geneticists
British neuroscientists
Alumni of Trinity Hall, Cambridge
Living people
1970 births
Max Planck Institute directors
Alumni of St Catherine's College, Oxford